Joe de la Cruz is an American businessman, sheetmetal worker, and politician serving as a member of the Connecticut House of Representatives from the 41st district. He assumed office in 2017.

Early life and education 
De la Cruz was born in Groton, Connecticut. He completed an apprenticeship through the CT Sheet Metal Workers program.

Career 
De la Cruz began his career as a sheetmetal worker and has since worked as a general manager. He served as a member of the Groton City Council from 2014 to 2016 and was also a member of the Groton Town Meeting. He was elected to the Connecticut House of Representatives in 2016 and assumed office in 2017. During his first legislative session, de la Cruz served as vice chair of the House Insurance and Real Estate Committee.

References 

Living people
People from Groton, Connecticut
Democratic Party members of the Connecticut House of Representatives
Hispanic and Latino American state legislators in Connecticut
21st-century American politicians
Year of birth missing (living people)